Laura Nyahuye (born Zimbabwe) is an artist based in Coventry, United Kingdom. She founded MAOKWO, a community arts organisation. She specialises in body adornments. In 2021, the Maokwo team was a member of the collaboration, including BOM, Kajul and Raymont-Osman that designed the Queen's Baton for the 2022 Commonwealth Games.

References

External links
 lauranyahuye.com

Zimbabwean women artists
Year of birth missing (living people)
Living people